Richard O'Sullivan (born 1944) is a British actor.

Richard (or Dick) O'Sullivan may also refer to:

 Richard O'Sullivan (filmmaker) (born 1968), American screenwriter, director, actor, producer, cinematographer, film editor, radio personality, and founder of Lost Colony Entertainment
 Richard O'Sullivan (teacher) (1826–1889), teacher and school inspector in Auckland
 Dick O'Sullivan, Irish boy featured on programme five of On the Street Where You Live
 Dick O'Sullivan, interim manager of Punchestown Racecourse

See also 
 Richard Sullivan (disambiguation)
 Rick O'Sullivan, the co-owner of Think Big (horse)